Fish That Sparkling Bubble is a collaborative studio album by Borbetomagus and Voice Crack, released in 1988 by Agaric Records.

Track listing

Personnel 
Adapted from Fish That Sparkling Bubble liner notes.

Musicians
 Don Dietrich – saxophone, producer
 Andy Guhl – electronics, producer
 Donald Miller – electric guitar, producer
 Norbert Möslang – electronics, producer
 Adam Nodelman – bass guitar, producer
 Jim Sauter – saxophone, producer

Production and additional personnel
 Jacques Kralian – engineering
 Ingeborg Strobl – cover art

Release history

References

External links 
 

1988 albums
Collaborative albums
Borbetomagus albums